Bissom is a hamlet in south Cornwall, England, United Kingdom situated half-a-mile east of Penryn.

Most of Bissom falls within the civil parish of Penryn but Bissom Farm is situated in Mylor civil parish. It is in the civil parish of Feock.

References

Hamlets in Cornwall